Ingvar Ericsson (5 January 1914 – 21 April 1995) was a Swedish cyclist. He competed in the individual and team road race events at the 1936 Summer Olympics.

References

External links
 

1914 births
1995 deaths
Swedish male cyclists
Olympic cyclists of Sweden
Cyclists at the 1936 Summer Olympics
Sportspeople from Uppsala